Olkhovka is a rural locality (a settlement) in Cherdynsky District, Perm Krai, Russia. The population was 170 as of 2010. There are 9 streets.

Geography 
Olkhovka is located 68 km northwest of Cherdyn (the district's administrative centre) by road. Ust-Kaib is the nearest rural locality.

References 

Rural localities in Cherdynsky District